Les 1001 Nuits is a French-Italian fantasy film loosely based on the ancient Arabic legend One Thousand and One Nights. It is directed by Philippe de Broca and stars Catherine Zeta-Jones as Sheherazade, who has married a king (Thierry Lhermitte), who desires to have many virgin wives, but only one at a time. As soon as the King has consummated his relationship with a new wife, he has her put to death at sunrise. Sheherazade delays this unfortunate ending by putting off the connubial event for a thousand and one nights, telling irresistible stories that are unfinished when the sun rises. In this version, Sheherazade finds a magical lamp that holds the genie Jimmy Genius (Gerard Jugnot) who is from the 20th century. Jimmy helps Sheherazade by providing her with 20th-century technology including a parachute that is used to drop a nude Sheherazade into a man's lap.

Actress Catherine Zeta Jones received her first film role in Les 1001 Nuits. The film was shot in 1989 and released in 1990 to little acclaim.

Plot
In Arabia, the Caliph orders that every morning he should marry with beautiful girls, because every night he kills them. One day a beautiful girl named Scheherazade decides to rebel against the authority of the bloody caliph, telling fantastic stories every night to him; so that she will not be killed. Among the stories is that of Sinbad the sailor, who turns seven trips into seven different lands, knowing monsters, magical creatures, and finding priceless treasures. When Sheherazade ends her stories, invokes the help of the Genie of the Lamp, already protagonist of a story of the girl, which leads Sheherazade in the modern world.

Cast

 Thierry Lhermitte as The King
 Gérard Jugnot as Jimmy Genius
 Catherine Zeta-Jones as Scheherazade
 Stéphane Freiss as Aladdin
 Vittorio Gassman as Sindbad
 Roger Carel as The Grand Vizier

Production
Production on Les 1001 Nuits began on April 17, 1989. The lead actress Catherine Zeta-Jones was performing at the West End theatre when she was spotted by Philippe de Broca who offered her the role in the film. The film was shot in France, Morocco, and Tunisia. Production ended on August 1, 1989.

Release
The film was released in 1990. The film was released on VHS in 1990 in France.

This film was broadcast as a double telefilm on Antenne 2 in the early 1990s. The DVD version is the one released in the cinema, which is shortened and has fewer characters.

A 2 DVD edition of the film was released in 2004.

Reception

Box office
In Paris, the film sold 29,340 tickets in its first week. At the end of its theatrical run in Paris, it sold 72,409 tickets. It sold a total of 254,739 tickets in France, where it was the 78th top-grossing film of 1990.

Critical response
In 2004, The Daily Telegraph stated the film received "little acclaim" and was remembered mostly for "its enjoyable nude scenes".

Notes

External links
 

1990 films
1990s fantasy adventure films
French fantasy adventure films
1990s fantasy comedy films
Italian fantasy adventure films
Italian fantasy comedy films
French fantasy comedy films
Films directed by Philippe de Broca
Films shot in France
Films shot in Morocco
Films shot in Tunisia
Genies in film
Films based on One Thousand and One Nights
Films scored by Gabriel Yared
Films set in Baghdad
1990 comedy films
1990s French films